Gastrozona fasciata is a species of tephritid or fruit flies in the genus Gastrozona of the family Tephritidae.

References

Dacinae